The Swiss Cup  is a football cup competition that has been organised annually since 1925–26 by the Swiss Football Association. 

The Swiss Cup Final is usually the most important game of the year with a high attendance. The competition is also shaped by games in the first rounds when villages celebrate the tie of their club with a professional team leading to iinfrastructure improvements and often thousands of spectators at the local football pitch. Since 1999 the winner earns the chance to qualify for the UEFA Europa League or the UEFA Europa Conference League in accordance with the rankings of Switzerland in the UEFA coefficient.

History

Forerunners 
Before the foundation of the Swiss Cup, there were two attempts at creating a Swiss football cup competition: the Anglo Cup (1909-13) and the Och Cup (1920-22).

Anglo Cup and winners
The Anglo Cup (named after the Zurich sports magazine "Anglo-American") was played from 1909–10 to 1912–13.

Och Cup and winners 
The Och Cup (named after the sporting goods company "Och Frères") was played in 1920–21 and 1921–22. The Swiss football and athletics association (which was how the Swiss Football Association was called between 1919 and 1955) stated the following in its annual report: “The well-known sports company Och Frères has provided the football department with a cup called the Och Cup. This cup is intended to replace the former "Anglo Cup" and is to be played according to the system of the English FA Cup ". FC Bern was the first club to win the new trophy, Concordia Basel won the second edition. Then in 1925, as the Swiss Football Association decided to launch its own official Swiss Cup, the Och Cup was played-out between the two previous winners. In the play-off on 11 January 1925, FC Bern beat Concordia Basel 2-0 and thus definitely came into possession of the Och Cup. The original trophy is now again in the possession of the Och family.

Foundation 
Upon the initiative of Eugen Landolt (the then President of FC Baden) the competition called "Swiss Cup" was organized in the season 1925–26 by the Swiss Football and Athletics Association (SFAV), as the Swiss Football Association used to call itself.

Swiss Cup finals

Performance by clubs
Years in bold indicate a double.

See also
 Swiss Football League

References

External links

 SFV Swiss Cup homepage 
 Switzerland Cup Finals at the RSSSF

 
Switzerland
Swiss Cup
Recurring sporting events established in 1926
1920s establishments in Switzerland